The American Football Coaches Association (AFCA) is an association of over 11,000 American football coaches and staff on all levels. According to its constitution, some of the main goals of the American Football Coaches Association are to "maintain the highest possible standards in football and the profession of coaching football," and to "provide a forum for the discussion and study of all matters pertaining to football and coaching."  The AFCA, along with USA Today, is responsible for the Division I Football Bowl Subdivision Coaches Poll.  The AFCA is also responsible for the Top 25 poll for Division II and Division III football.

The AFCA was founded in a meeting for 43 coaches at the Hotel Astor in New York City on Dec. 27, 1921.  It is headquartered in Waco, Texas (the headquarters building is located across from Baylor University, formerly coached by AFCA executive director Grant Teaff).

The association has over 10,000 members and represents coaches at all levels including the National Collegiate Athletic Association, the National Association of Collegiate Directors of Athletics, the National Association of Intercollegiate Athletics, the National Junior College Athletic Association, the National Federation of State High School Associations, the National Football League, the Canadian Football League, USA Football, the National Football Foundation, College Football Hall of Fame, and Pop Warner Football.  The AFCA is considered the primary professional association for football coaches at all levels of competition.

Another primary goal of the American Football Coaches Association is the promotion of safety.  The association has established a code of ethics and has made many safety recommendations.  An annual injury survey begun by the AFCA in the 1930s has provided valuable data and has led to a remarkable reduction of injuries in the sport down through the years. The NCAA Rules Committee often follows recommendations made by the AFCA.

All-American Teams 

Since 1945, the American Football Coaches Association has selected an All-American team. It is the only one selected exclusively by the coaches themselves.

 See also: 2009 All-American team

AFCA National Championship Trophy 

The AFCA National Championship Trophy is the trophy awarded by the American Football Coaches Association (AFCA) to the winner of college football's Coaches Poll. From 1992 to 2013 the trophy was contractually obligated to be awarded to the winner of the Bowl Coalition (1992-1994), Bowl Alliance (1995-1997), and Bowl Championship Series (1998-2013) national championship game winner. The trophy has been awarded since 1986 but teams that won the Coaches Poll from earlier seasons can purchase replicas for those years.

AFCA Coach of the Year

Amos Alonzo Stagg Award

Since 1940, the AFCA has awarded the annual Amos Alonzo Stagg Award to the "individual, group or institution whose services have been outstanding in the advancement of the best interests of football."

Tuss McLaughry Award 

The Tuss McLaughry Award, established in 1964, is given to a distinguished American (or Americans) for the highest distinction in service to others. It is named in honor of DeOrmond "Tuss" McLaughry, the first full-time secretary-treasurer of the AFCA and one of the most dedicated and influential members in the history of the association.

Tuss McLaughry, the award's namesake,  began his coaching career at his alma mater, Westminster (Pa.) College in 1916. During his early days in coaching, McLaughry spent his spare time playing pro football with the Massillon (Ohio) Tigers. Knute Rockne was a teammate. He went on to become head coach at Amherst (1922–25), Brown (1926–40), and Dartmouth (1941–55). McLaughry retired from coaching in 1954, but continued in his capacity as chairman of the Physical Education Department at Dartmouth until 1960, when he accepted the appointment with the AFCA. He retired from that position in 1965.

Winners

1964 Gen. Douglas MacArthur, armed forces
1965 Bob Hope, entertainer
1966 Lyndon B. Johnson, U.S. President
1967 Dwight D. Eisenhower, U.S. President
1968 J. Edgar Hoover, director, FBI
1969 The Reverend Billy Graham, evangelist
1970 Richard M. Nixon, U.S. President
1971 Edwin Aldrin, Neil Armstrong, Michael Collins, Apollo 11 astronauts
1974 John Wayne, actor
1975 Gerald R. Ford, U.S. President
1977 Gen. James A. Van Fleet, armed forces
1979 James Stewart, actor
1980 Lt. Gen. Jimmy Doolittle, armed forces
1981 Dr. Jerome Holland, educator, business executive
1982 Robert L. Crippen & John W. Young, astronauts
1983 Ronald Reagan, U.S. President
1985 Pete Rozelle, commissioner, NFL
1986 Gen. Pete Dawkins, armed forces

1987 Gen. Chuck Yeager, armed forces
1988 Lindsey Nelson, sportscaster
1989 George Shultz, U.S. Secretary of State
1990 Burt Reynolds, actor
1993 Tom Landry, Dallas Cowboys
1994 Charley Boswell, war hero
1996 Eddie Robinson, Grambling State University
1998 George Bush, U.S. President
2001 Andrew Young, U.N. Ambassador
2002 Roger Staubach, Businessman, Pro and College Football Hall of Famer
2003 Dr. Stephen Ambrose, Author and historian
2004 Gen. Tommy Franks, armed forces
2005 Dr. Christopher Kraft, NASA
2007 Paul Tagliabue, commissioner, NFL
2008 Tom Osborne, Coach and Congressman
2009 Rudy Giuliani, mayor, New York City
2010 Tony Dungy, Tampa Bay Buccaneers, Indianapolis Colts
2013 Robert Mueller, director, FBI

Presidents

Maj. Charles Daly of the U.S. Military Academy was the first president of the American Football Coaches Association.  He was followed by John Heisman.  Other presidents have included Bear Bryant, Darrell Royal, Eddie Robinson, Charles McClendon, Bo Schembechler and Vince Dooley.

See also
Walter Camp Man of the Year
Walter Camp Distinguished American Award
Walter Camp Alumni of the Year
National Football Foundation Distinguished American Award
National Football Foundation Gold Medal Winners
Theodore Roosevelt Award (NCAA)

External links
 Official site

American football organizations
College football coaches in the United States
College football mass media
Foot
Organizations based in Waco, Texas
Sports organizations established in 1922
1922 establishments in the United States